Peter Žilka (born 21 February 1994) is a Slovak judoka.

He is the bronze medallist of the 2018 Judo Grand Prix The Hague in the -90 kg category.

References

External links
 

1994 births
Living people
Slovak male judoka
European Games competitors for Slovakia
Judoka at the 2019 European Games